Sambli Dheri is one of the 51 union councils of Abbottabad District in Khyber-Pakhtunkhwa province of Pakistan. According to the 2017 Census of Pakistan, the population is 8,549.

Subdivisions
 Bandi Hamza
 Bandi Pahar
 Chak
 Gali Mohri
 Phogran
 Sambli Dheri

References

Union councils of Abbottabad District